Cecile Hulse Matschat (1895–March 4, 1976) was an American geographer and botanist, known best as the author of books on gardens, gardening and the Okefenokee Swamp.

Biography 
Cecile Hulse Matschat was born in 1895 and grew up in upstate New York, later studying art at the Pratt Institute. 

Growing up, she began studying orchids in nearby swamps and in New Jersey, eventually expanding her explorations to the Everglades, West Indies, Central America and Mexico. She collected the orchids for paintings.

Throughout Matschat's career, she wrote 16 books including her Rivers of America book on the Suwannee River —Suwanee River: Strange Green Land (Farrar & Rinehart, 1938)— provided rare insight into the society and history of the people of the Okefenokee Swamp. She won a Literary Guild award and membership in the Explorer's Club for the work. Matschat was a member of the Society of Woman Geographers from 1937 to 1966. 

Matschat died on March 4, 1976, in New York City.

Works

 Mexican Plants for American Gardens (Houghton Mifflin Co., Boston, 1935)
 The Garden Calendar (Houghton Mifflin, 1936)
 The Garden Primers (Houghton Mifflin, 1937), illustrated by Jean Martin
 How to Make a Garden
 Planning the Home Grounds
 Annuals and Perennials 
 Shrubs and Trees
 Bulbs and House Plants
 Suwanee River: Strange Green Land (Farrar & Rinehart, New York, 1938), illus. Alexander Key – Volume 3 of the Rivers of America Series
 Seven Grass Huts: An Engineer's Wife in Central And South America (Farrar & Rinehart, 1939), illus. Matschat
 American Wild Flowers (Random House, New York, 1940)
 Preacher on Horseback (Farrar & Rinehart, 1940; Cassell, London, 1941)
 Murder in Okefenokee (Farrar & Rinehart, 1941)
 American Butterflies and Moths (Random House, 1942), illus. Rudolf Freund
 Tavern in the Town (Farrar & Rinehart, 1942; Cassell, 1944)
 Highway to Heaven (Farrar & Rinehart, 1942)
 Murder at the Black Crook''' (Farrar & Rinehart, 1943; Cassell, 1945)
 Land of the Big Swamp: A Story of the Okefenokee Settlement (John C. Winston, Philadelphia, 1954), illus. Alexander Key
 Animals Of The Valley Of The Amazon'' (Abelard-Schuman, New York, 1965), illus. Edward Osmond

See also

References

External links
 Cecile Hulse Matschat at Library of Congress Authorities — with 19 catalog records

1895 births
1976 deaths
American garden writers
American nature writers
Members of the Society of Woman Geographers
Pratt Institute alumni